EXIM Bank Agricultural University Bangladesh is the first private agricultural university in Bangladesh.

History
Honorable Prime Minister of the People's Republic of Bangladesh, Sheikh Hasina inaugurated the university through a function at her official residence Ganobhaban on 9 October 2013. Until 2013, there was no existence of private agricultural university in Bangladesh.

Academics
EBAUB uses English as its Medium of Instruction and implements Term based Course Credit System, where the student can understand going through the following points thoroughly:  
 The Course Credit System: The course credit system involves course work with regular classes, assignments, unannounced quizzes, and pre-scheduled 2 midterms and final examinations. In this system, subject matter is taught in modules (courses) of reasonably homogenous subject matter, The students will receive “Grades” for each of the courses taken to indicate the extent of his/her mastery of the subject matter taught in each respective course. 
 Term: An academic year is divided into three terms – Summer, Autumn and Winter. Each term consists of 12 (twelve) effective weeks. 
 Credit: One class hour in a week during a term shall be considered as one credit. For laboratory classes, two class hours shall be considered as one credit.  
 Course: A course is a set of topics delivered to the students by lectures, contact hours and practical exercises on a specific subject incorporated in the approved curricular layout and developed by faculty members.

Faculties and departments

Faculty of Agriculture
Agricultural Extension and Rural Development
Agroforestry and Environment
Agronomy
Agricultural Engineering
Agro-processing
Biochemistry and Molecular Biology
Environmental Science
Biotechnology
Computer Science and Information Technology( CSIT )
Crop Botany
Entomology
Genetics and Plant Breeding
Horticulture
Plant Pathology
Soil Science
Seed Science and Technology Unit

Faculty of Agricultural Economics and Rural Development
Department of Agricultural Economics
Department of Agribusiness
Department of Agricultural Finance & Cooperatives
Department of Rural Development
Department of Statistics

Faculty of Business Administration 
Department of Accounting
Department of Finance
Department of Marketing
Department of Management

Faculty of LAW
Department of LAW and Justice

Permanent campus
EXIM Bank Agricultural University Bangladesh, Has started procuring land for its permanent campus. In an area near Amnura the university has already purchased land for its initial phase and aims to procure 1200 Bigha (480.628272 Acres) very soon.

Memorandum of Understanding with other Universities
EXIM Bank Agricultural University has Signed MOU with the following Academic Institutions 
 Charles Sturt University, Queensland, Australia
 Sabaragamuwa University of Sri Lanka 
 Universiti Teknologi MARA, Malaysia
 University of Kuala Lumpur, Malaysia
 Begum Rokeya University, Rangpur, Bangladesh

Available programs

Undergraduate
 BS. Agriculture
 BS. Agricultural Economics
 B.B.A
 L.L.B

Postgraduate
EMBA (Executive Master in Business Administration)
MBA (Master in Business Administration)
MBM (Master in Bank Management)

See also
 University of Rajshahi (RU)
 Rajshahi University of Engineering & Technology (RUET)
 University of Dhaka (DU)
 List of universities in Bangladesh

References

External links
Official website 

Educational institutions established in 2013
Rajshahi
Universities and colleges in Bangladesh
Agricultural universities and colleges in Bangladesh
2013 establishments in Bangladesh